Liberal corporatism is the application of economic corporatism by liberal political parties and organizations, that recognizes the bargaining interests of multiple groups within society, such as in the business, labour, and agricultural sectors and licenses them to engage in bargaining over economic policy with the state. Liberal corporatism is often in conflict from proponents of liberal pluralism that opposes the granting of power to organized interest groups. English liberal philosopher John Stuart Mill supported corporatist-like economic associations as needing to predominate in society to create equality for labourers and give them a voice in management through democratic economic rights. Unlike a number of other forms of corporatism, liberal corporatism does not reject capitalism or individualism, but believes that a business is a social institution that requires its managers to go beyond achieving the bottom line, by recognizing the needs of their members. This liberal corporatist ethic was similar to Taylorism but called for democratization of the capitalism firm. Liberal corporatists believed that inclusion of all members in the election of management would bring them into the process of management and in effect "reconcile ethics and efficiency, freedom and order, liberty and rationality".

Liberal corporatism was an influential component of the progressivism in the United States that has been referred to as "interest group liberalism". The support by labour leaders' advocacy of liberal corporatism of the U.S. progressives is believed to have been influenced by an attraction to the syndicalism and particularly the anarcho-syndicalism at the time in Europe. In the United States, economic liberal corporatism involving capital-labour cooperation was influential in Fordism. Liberal corporatism is commonly supported by proponents in Austria, the Netherlands, Denmark, Finland, Norway, and Sweden.

References

Political theories
Liberalism